Red nines is a simple card game for four or more players. It is largely a game of luck, and is suitable for players of any age. Games with more than four players are best when played without hesitation.

The origin of the game is uncertain, although it is known to have been played in south-west London during the 1950s. A card game called red nines is mentioned in Holme Lee's Ashburn Rectory story from the 1850s.

Objective
The aim of this game is to make the lowest possible score by discarding as many cards as possible. At the end of each round of play, the value of the cards remaining in a player's hand counts against them. The player who ends the round by discarding the last of their cards thus makes a score of zero in that round. The number of rounds is determined by the number of players.

Play
One complete pack (without jokers) is used if there are four players, with an extra suit added for each additional player. There should be equal numbers of red and black suits if there is an even number of players. If there is an odd number of players there should be one more red suit than black suits. All the cards are dealt, so that each player has 13 cards.

The player to the left of the dealer commences play by discarding cards in ascending numerical sequence. The player may start with any card, laying as many as they wish of the starting card's rank, but only one of each rank after this. The player continues to discard cards in ascending numerical sequence until reaching a point where they do not have the next card. The next player then continues the sequence if able to do so, otherwise that player must miss a turn and play is continued by the first player able to lay the required card.

Players should announce their discards so that all players can follow what is happening easily; for example a player might say “eight, nine, ten, jack, no queen”. If the next player has a queen they would lay it and if possible a king as well. Discarding a king confers the right to start a new sequence at any number, including another king. Play continues until one player discards the last card in their hand or "goes out".

Sometimes no player will have the next required card, everyone having announced “no–“ (whatever the required card is). When this happens the player who was last able to discard plays again, beginning a fresh sequence at any point.

Red 9 cards
Red 9s (i.e.,  and ) are wild cards and may be used to substitute for any card of a different rank. If a nine is the next number required in the ongoing sequence, a player with no nine other than a red one may say “no nine” and hold it in reserve. This could, however, be a risky strategy.

It is not necessary to announce the use of the red 9 to substitute for any other card. The player simply announces the card that the red 9 replaces as if they had that card. It is up to the other players to observe that a red 9 is being used.

The first turn
Being the first to discard in a round confers a useful advantage, especially if the player has one or more aces. The player may, as stated above, play more than one of their first card. After this, no player may discard more than one card of the same rank at a time (although discarding a king and starting again with another king can give the appearance of laying more than one king as a discard).

Scoring
Each player has one opportunity to be the first to discard, so the number of rounds equals the number of players. After the end of the final round all the scores are totalled and the player having the lowest score is declared the winner.

Each card from 2 to 10 scores its face value. Jacks score 11, queens 12 and kings 13. Aces, although representing 1 in the sequence, score 20. (An alternative simpler scoring convention, favoured by American players, is for the jacks, queens and kings each to score 10 and the ace 11.) If a player is caught with a red 9 in-hand when another player goes out, the caught player's score is doubled. Two red 9s would quadruple the score. Conversely if the last card discarded by the player going out is a red 9 that player should announce "out on a red 9", and the scores of all the other players are doubled.

Strategy
Success in red nines is mainly determined by luck rather than skill, although there are some opportunities for strategic decisions to be made. In general it is desirable to discard higher scoring cards when starting a sequence, especially an ace even if the player has no two (“ace, no two”). Deciding when to play a red 9 can make a big difference–they can be very valuable to fill in a gap, but getting caught with one should be avoided.

See also
 Curse of Scotland

References

Shedding-type card games